Gabrielle Bell (born March 24, 1976 in London, England) is a British-American alternative cartoonist known for her surrealist, melancholy semi-autobiographical stories.

Early life
When Bell was two, her American mother divorced her British father and took Gabrielle and her brother back to the United States. Ending up in a relatively isolated rural town in Mendocino County, Bell writes that she "grew up . . .  spending a lot of time reading, walking in the woods, and making up stories." As a teenager Bell attended a college program for low-income and at-risk students hosted by Humboldt State University, where she took classes in Shakespeare and composition. When Bell was 17 she traveled in Europe, including England, where she met her British relatives. Later moving to San Francisco, Bell took art classes at the City College of San Francisco, worked in a series of dead-end retail jobs, and began self-publishing her comics. She currently lives in Brooklyn, NY.

Career

Books of... 
From about 1998 to 2002, Bell annually self-published a 32-page minicomic, each of whose titles began with "Book of...", including Book of Insomnia, Book of Sleep, Book of Black, Book of Lies, and Book of Ordinary Things. Many of the stories from those comics were collected in When I'm Old and Other Stories, published by Alternative Comics in 2003.

Lucky 
In 2003, Bell began the self-published semi-autobiographical Lucky series, of which the third won a 2003 Ignatz Award for Most Outstanding Minicomic. Lucky details Bell's day-to-day existence in a 
frank and good-humored manner, as she navigates a world of dilapidated rental apartments, low-paying jobs, yoga classes, roommate misadventures, and artistic frustration. These snippets of daily life in the Williamsburg section of Brooklyn, New York, are comforting in their familiarity; by settling into the rhythm of the artist's daily life, the reader experiences the heft of small victories and simple pleasures. Lucky tells of the anguish of nude modeling; sex-obsessed, adolescent art students; and Bell's own foibles.

Lucky was collected by Drawn & Quarterly in fall 2006, and launched as a new series (vol. 2), also by Drawn & Quarterly, in 2007.

Cecil and Jordan in New York 
Cecil and Jordan in New York (Drawn & Quarterly) is a collection of Bell's short comics work that has been published in various anthologies, including Kramers Ergot (Buenaventura Press), Mome (Fantagraphics), and Drawn & Quarterly Showcase Book Four.

The Voyeurs 
The Voyeurs (Uncivilized Books, 2012) is a real-time memoir of a turbulent five years in the life of renowned cartoonist, diarist and filmmaker Gabrielle Bell. It collects episodes from her award-winning series, Lucky, in which she travels to Tokyo, Paris, and the South of France and all over the United States, but remains anchored by her beloved Brooklyn, where sidekick Tony provides ongoing insight, offbeat humor and enduring friendship.

Michel Gondry 
Bell collaborated with director Michel Gondry on a film adaptation of the title story of Cecil and Jordan in New York, in which a young woman turns herself into a chair so as not to be too much of a bother to those around her. The film, titled Interior Design, was co-written by Bell and Gondry and directed by Gondry as part of the film Tôkyô!.

Bell and Gondry also collaborated on Kuruma Tohrimasu, a collection of drawings and photographs made during the production of Interior Design. Conceived of as a thank-you gift for the film's cast and crew, Kuruma Tohrimasu is published as part of Drawn & Quarterly’s Petits Livres series.

Anthologies 
Bell was a regular contributor to Fantagraphics' quarterly anthology Mome. She has also contributed to publications such as The New Yorker, Kramers Ergot (Buenaventura Press), Stereoscomic (Stereoscomic), Bogus Dead (Alternative), Orchid (Sparkplug Comics), The Comics Journal Special Edition 2005 (Fantagraphics), Scheherazade (Soft Skull Press), Linus, and Shout! magazine. Her work has been included three times in the annual Best American Comics anthology series.

Everything is Flammable 
Bell's first full-length graphic memoir, Everything is Flammable, was released in April 2017 with publisher Uncivilized Books. Everything is Flammable was chosen as one of the best graphic novels of 2017 by Entertainment Weekly, a finalist for the 2017 Los Angeles Times Book Prize as Best Graphic Novel/Comic, and nominated for a Broken Frontier Award for Best Graphic Non-Fiction. The book also received praises from acclaimed writers such as Joyce Carol Oates and Tao Lin. 

Bell has been a writer/artist in residence at several institutions, including Bryn Mawr and Baruch College.

Bibliography (selected) 

 When I'm Old and Other Stories (Alternative Comics, 2003) 
 Lucky (Drawn & Quarterly, 2006) 
 Lucky vol. 2. (Drawn & Quarterly, 2007, ongoing)
 Cecil and Jordan in New York: Stories by Gabrielle Bell (Drawn & Quarterly, 2008) 
 Kuruma Tohrimasu (Drawn & Quarterly, 2008) 
 The Voyeurs (Uncivilized Books, 2012) 
 Truth is Fragmentary: Travelogues & Diaries (Uncivilized Books, 2014) 
Everything is Flammable (Uncivilized Books, April 2017)

Notes

External links 
 Gabrielle Bell's website
 Gabrielle Bell's books and comics published by Uncivilized Books
 Bell's adaptation of Emily Dickinson's "It was not death, for I stood up." "The Poem as Comic Strip #2," Poetry Foundation (PDF).
 Berlatsky, Noah. "The Real Gabrielle Bell," The Hooded Utilitarian (Nov. 5, 2007).
 Clough, Rob. "Deadpan: Gabrielle Bell's Lucky (Dec. 13, 2006).
 Cronin, Brian. "A Month of Art Stars — Gabrielle Bell," Comic Book Resources (Sept. 25, 2008).
 Meginnis, Mike. "'The Hole,' and Other True Fictions," The Webcomics Examiner.

Interviews 
 Interview from Mome vol. 2 (July 17, 2005).
 January 2007 Bookslut interview (Jan. 2007).
 SMITH Magazine interview (Jan. 8, 2007).
 Paul Gravett interview (Jan. 19, 2007).
 Daily Cross Hatch interview, part I (July 29, 2008).
 Daily Cross Hatch interview, part II (Aug. 4, 2008).
 Daily Cross Hatch interview, part III (Aug. 12, 2008).
 Daily Cross Hatch interview, part IV (Aug. 19, 2008).

English emigrants to the United States
Artists from Brooklyn
Artists from California
Artists from London
Alternative cartoonists
American female comics artists
British female comics artists
Female comics writers
Living people
1976 births
Writers from California
Writers from Brooklyn
People from Mendocino County, California
20th-century American women writers
21st-century American women writers